Abacetus amplithorax is a species of ground beetle in the subfamily Pterostichinae. It was described by Straneo in 1940 and is an endemic species of Sao Tome and Principe.

References

amplithorax
Beetles described in 1940
Insects of Central Africa